Debra Williams (born October 23, 1972) is a former professional basketball player for the Charlotte Sting.

Personal life
Williams majored in psychology at Louisiana Tech University. She was married to Herb Williams, a former NBA player, and has two children: one boy and one girl.

References

External links
 Debra Williams WNBA Stats | Basketball-Reference.com
 
 WNBA Draft History

Living people
1972 births
All-American college women's basketball players
American women's basketball players
Charlotte Sting players
Louisiana Tech Lady Techsters basketball players